William Tom (March 8, 1923 – October 31, 2012) was an American gymnast. He won the 1949 National AAU Championships in the vault. He competed in eight events at the 1956 Summer Olympics. He was inducted into the U.S. Gymnastics Hall of Fame in 1992.

References

External links
 

1923 births
2012 deaths
American male artistic gymnasts
Olympic gymnasts of the United States
American sportspeople of Chinese descent
Gymnasts at the 1956 Summer Olympics
Sportspeople from San Francisco